Behold This Woman is a 1924 American silent drama film directed by J. Stuart Blackton and starring Irene Rich, Marguerite De La Motte and Charles A. Post.

Cast
 Irene Rich as Louise Maurel 
 Marguerite De La Motte as Sophie 
 Charles A. Post as John Strangeway 
 Harry Myers as Eugene de Seyre 
 Rosemary Theby as Calavera 
 Anders Randolf as Stephen Strangeway

References

Bibliography
 Munden, Kenneth White. The American Film Institute Catalog of Motion Pictures Produced in the United States, Part 1. University of California Press, 1997.

External links

1924 films
1924 drama films
Silent American drama films
American silent feature films
1920s English-language films
Vitagraph Studios films
Films directed by J. Stuart Blackton
American black-and-white films
1920s American films